This is a list of seasons played by Gateshead F.C. in English football, from 1930 (when the original Gateshead A.F.C. first played in Gateshead -prior to that they were South Shields FC) to the present day. It details the club's achievements in major competitions, and the top scorers for each season.

Seasons

Key

P = Played
W = Games won
D = Games drawn
L = Games lost
F = Goals for
A = Goals against
Pts = Points
Pos = Final position

Div 3N = Football League Third Division North
Div 4 = Football League Fourth Division
National = National League
CONFP = Conference Premier
CONFN = Conference North
NPLP = Northern Premier League Premier Division
NPL1 = Northern Premier League First Division
NCOS = Northern Counties League
NREG = North Regional League
MID = Midland League
NC = Northern Combination League
WEAR = Wearside Football League

D3NC = Football League Third Division North Cup
CLC = Conference League Cup
ULC = Unibond League Challenge Cup
ULS = Unibond League Challenge Shield
CC = Unibond League Chairman's Cup
PC = Unibond League President's Cup
DCC = Durham Challenge Cup
SCC = Senior County Cup
DSP = Durham Senior Professional Cup

GR1 = First Group Stage
GR2 = Second Group Stage
PRE = Preliminary Round
1Q = First Qualifying Round
2Q = Second Qualifying Round
3Q = Third Qualifying Round
4Q = Fourth Qualifying Round
R1 = Round 1
R2 = Round 2
R3 = Round 3
R4 = Round 4
QF = Quarter-finals
SF = Semi-finals
RU = Runners-up
W = Winners

References

Sources

 Unofficial Gateshead Football Club Statistics Database
 Since 1888... The Searchable Premiership and Football League Player Database

Gateshead
 
Seasons